
The construction of mosques in Russia has been documented from the 1550s to 2010 and mirrors the history of Islam in Russia. Russian mosques span the mosques of Europe and Asia.

Mosques of note

List 
The following is a partial list of mosques in Russia.

References

This article incorporates information from the Russian Wikipedia and French Wikipedia.

Further reading
 

 
Mosques
russia